Henry Slocum and Howard Taylor won the title by defeating Valentine Hall and Oliver Campbell in the final.

Draw

References 
 

U.S. National Championships - Men's Doubles
U.S. National Championships (tennis) by year – Men's doubles